Du Xi ( 190s–231), courtesy name Zixu, was an adviser to the warlord Cao Cao during the late Eastern Han dynasty of China. He was a subordinate of Cao Cao's general Xiahou Yuan. Du Xi proposed to the troops that Zhang He take command after Xiahou Yuan was killed at the Battle of Mount Dingjun. He continued serving as an official in the state of Cao Wei, established by Cao Cao's successor Cao Pi, during the Three Kingdoms period.

See also
 Lists of people of the Three Kingdoms

References

 Chen, Shou (3rd century). Records of Three Kingdoms (Sanguozhi).
 Pei, Songzhi (5th century). Annotations to Records of the Three Kingdoms (Sanguozhi zhu).

Year of birth unknown
Year of death unknown
Officials under Cao Cao
Politicians from Pingdingshan
Liu Biao and associates
Cao Wei politicians
Han dynasty politicians from Henan